Margaret Stevenson (c.1807 – 28 September 1874) was an English Australian writers. She was well known as a satirist and columnist in Adelaide where she wrote under the pseudonym "A Colonist" for the South Australian Gazette and Colonial Register.

She married George Stevenson in 1836.

References
Leith G. MacGillivray, Stevenson, Margaret (c. 1807–1874), Australian Dictionary of Biography, Supplementary Volume, Melbourne University Press, 2005, p. 371.

Sources
 http://trove.nla.gov.au/newspaper/article/208173215?

1874 deaths
Australian poets
Australian columnists
Australian diarists
Australian satirists
Women satirists
Year of birth uncertain
Writers from Adelaide
Women diarists
Australian women columnists
Australian women poets
19th-century Australian women